Howard A. Stephenson (born November 7, 1950) is a Utah politician who represented the State's 11th senate district in Salt Lake County including Draper from 1992 through 2018.

Personal life, education, and career
Stephenson received a B.S. degree in psychology and aerospace studies from Brigham Young University, and a Master of Public Administration (1977), also from Brigham Young University. Since then, he has worked as a taxpayer advocate, and from 1988 to 2021 he served as president of the Utah Taxpayers Association. He currently consults and speaks nationally on digital teaching and learning, advocating for personalized teaching and learning and K-12 dual language immersion. Stephenson is a member of the Church of Jesus Christ of Latter-day Saints (LDS).

Notable quotes
Regarding Utah teachers using technology in the classroom, "...are we going to have to wait like Moses did...wandering 40 years in the wilderness for the old ones to die off before we can really embrace this with fidelity?" 

Regarding college and university degrees which don't produce jobs suitable for the recipient, "...degrees to nowhere."

Regarding his announcement of retirement from the state senate, "I’ve never experienced air being sucked out of a room before."

Political career
As a Utah state senator, Stephenson is well-positioned to influence Utah legislation relating to education and to state revenues.
As a state senator, Stephenson has won the following awards: 
Utah Republican Hispanic Assembly Recognition
Utah Council for Exceptional Children Legislator of the Year
Utah Association for Gifted Children Community Service Award
Coalition for People with Disabilities 1995, 1998, 2001, 2002 "Hero on the Hill" Award
Alpine School District Children's Behavioral Therapy Unit Autism Preschool Recognition
Education Leadership Coalition Recognition
Utah Valley Autism Preschool Recognition
Utah Food Industry Association 2001, 2004 Outstanding Legislative Service Award
Utah Farm Bureau Federation Friend of Agriculture Award
Utah Information Technology Association Recognition
National Federation of Independent Business Guardian of Small Business Award
Utah Taxpayers Association Friend of the Taxpayer Award
Utah Restaurant Association Legislator of the Year, 2003, 2004
Utah Health Insurance Association Legislator of the Year
Utah Correctional Industries Award
Sandy City Outstanding Elected Official
Grassroots Distinguished Service Award
Utah Association of Realtors Distinguished Service Award

During his 26 years in the Utah Senate, Stephenson served on the following committees: 
Higher Education Appropriations Subcommittee
Health & Human Services Appropriations Subcommittee (Senate Chair)
Public Education Appropriations Subcommittee (Senate Chair)
Senate Education Committee (Chair)
Senate Revenue and Taxation Committee (Chair)
Administrative Rules Review Committee (Senate Chair)

Election

2014

Legislation

2016 sponsored bills

Notable legislation  
Stephenson is a proponent of year-round schools. He believes that moving public schools to a trimester schedule will save money. On his campaign website, he states that he supports "tuition tax credits or vouchers."

He has proposed a bill which would require surety bonds for guest workers, to "ensure that . . . the people who are here have no criminal background, are disease free, and are paying their own cost of policing."

References

1950 births
American Latter Day Saints
Brigham Young University alumni
Living people
Republican Party Utah state senators
People from Draper, Utah
21st-century American politicians